Ezra Pound distinguished three aspects of poetry: melopoeia, phanopoeia, and logopoeia.

Melopoeia
Melopoeia or melopeia is when words are "charged" beyond their normal meaning with some musical property which further directs its meaning, inducing emotional correlations by sound and rhythm of the speech.

Melopoeia can be "appreciated by a foreigner with a sensitive ear" but does not translate well, according to Pound.

Phanopoeia
Phanopoeia or phanopeia is defined as "a casting of images upon the visual imagination," throwing the object (fixed or moving) on to the visual imagination. In the first publication of these three types, Pound refers to phanopoeia as "imagism."

Phanopoeia can be translated without much difficulty, according to Pound.

Logopoeia
Logopoeia or logopeia is defined by Pound as poetry that uses words for more than just their direct meaning, stimulating the visual imagination with phanopoeia and inducing emotional correlations with melopoeia.

Pound was said to have coined the word from Greek roots in a 1918 review of the "Others" poetry anthology — he defined the term as "the dance of the intellect among words." Elsewhere he changes intellect to intelligence. In the New York Herald Tribune of 20 January 1929, he gave a less opaque definition: poetry which "employs words not only for their direct meaning, but [...] takes count in a special way of habits of usage, of the context we expect to find with the word".

Logopoeia is the most recent kind of poetry and does not translate well, according to Pound, though he also claimed it was abundant in the poetry of Sextus Propertius (c.50BC-15BC).

The actual word "logopoeia" was not coined by Pound. The word already existed in classical Greek, as one sees by looking at any version of Liddell and Scott.

References

Literary concepts
Ezra Pound